The Stanford Financial Group was a privately held international group of financial services companies controlled by Allen Stanford, until it was seized by United States (U.S.) authorities in early 2009. 
Headquartered at 5050 Westheimer in Uptown Houston, Texas, it had 50 offices in several countries, mainly in the Americas, included the Stanford International Bank, and was said to have managed US$8.5 billion of assets for more than 30,000 clients in 136 countries on six continents.  On February 17, 2009, U.S. Federal agents placed the company into receivership due to charges of fraud. Ten days later, the U.S. Securities and Exchange Commission amended its complaint to accuse Stanford of turning the company into a "massive Ponzi scheme".

History 
Allen Stanford traced his company to the insurance company founded in 1932 in Mexia, Texas, by his grandfather, Lodis B. Stanford. However, there was no direct connection between the insurance company and Allen Stanford's banking business, which he started on the British Overseas Territory of Montserrat in the West Indies in the 1980s. Allen Stanford's move into banking utilised funds he had made in real estate in Houston in the early 1980s.

In 2008, Stanford Financial Group announced it would open a new global management complex in St. Croix, U.S. Virgin Islands, to include the base for the corporate support functions such as business technology, compliance, finance, human resources, investment strategy and legal, as well as the chairman's office. Completion was planned for July 2009 but did not occur due to the company's dissolution.

The company was bound by a web of personal and family ties. Stanford's chief financial officer and second-in-command, James M. Davis, was his roommate at Baylor University. The chief investment officer, Laura Pendergest-Holt, grew up attending a church in Baldwyn, Mississippi, where Davis was a Sunday school teacher. Many top officials were related to each other. This led former employees to claim the company was fraught with nepotism; former executive Charles Satterfield told Bloomberg News that whenever someone asked questions, a common response was "I'm not going to question my brother-in-law."

Affiliated companies
Stanford Financial Group comprised several affiliated companies:
Stanford Financial Group Company (SFGC) was an entity based in Houston, Texas, USA, that provided financial services to several of the affiliated companies, and in particular to Stanford International Bank Limited (SIBL). The services were provided via a "Services Agreement" that paved the way for investor deposits to be funneled via a circuitous route to multiple destinations, including affiliated companies that leased multiple corporate jets, owned yachts, funded a cricket pitch and even a Swiss bank account used to bribe officials.
 Stanford Capital Management, investment adviser, based on Houston
 Stanford Group Company, broker-dealer, based in Houston
 Stanford International Bank, was started in 1986 in Montserrat where it was called Guardian International Bank. Allen Stanford relocated its operations to Antigua.  On February 19, 2009 Nigel Hamilton-Smith and Peter Wastell of the British accounting firm Vantis were appointed joint receivers of the bank, and were made liquidators on April 15, 2009.  In June 2010, the High Court of Antigua resolved that Vantis should be removed from its responsibilities. The firm, which had recently received government approval to sell the property assets, appealed the decision.
 Stanford Trust Company, helped manage and protect wealth.  Vantis was also appointed receivers of Stanford Trust Company.
Bank of Antigua
 Stanford Coins and Bullion

Sponsorships and charity 
In 2007, Stanford Financial Group assumed title sponsorship of the Stanford St. Jude Championship, a top PGA Tour event to benefit St. Jude Children's Research Hospital of Memphis, Tennessee. On March 20, 2009, after the Group's fraud was revealed, the PGA announced that they would be dropping their affiliation with the company and that for 2009 the event would be called the St. Jude's Classic.

Stanford Financial Group was the lead financier for the 2007 film The Ultimate Gift,.  According to the Association for Healthcare Philanthropy, the story of The Ultimate Gift promoted philanthropy in not-for-profit health care institutions.

The group established a significant presence in golf, polo, tennis, cricket and sailing, sports which were popular among Stanford’s wealthy clients. Stanford Financial Group was the title sponsor for such sporting events as the Stanford U.S. Open Polo Championship, the Stanford USPA Silver Cup, the Stanford Antigua Sailing Week, the PGA Tour Stanford St. Jude Championship, and the Stanford International Pro-Am. Stanford also sponsored professional golfers Vijay Singh, Camilo Villegas and David Toms as well as Morgan Pressel on the LPGA Tour. In tennis, the company was a sponsor of the Sony Ericsson Open.  Stanford also sponsored the Champions Series Tennis Tournaments featuring Jim Courier, John McEnroe and Pete Sampras.

The Stanford Financial Tour Championship, previously known as the LPGA Playoffs at The ADT and the ADT Championship, was the season-ending golf tournament on the US-based LPGA Tour. Beginning with the 2009 event, it was to be sponsored by Stanford Financial Group.

As one of the founding partners, Stanford Financial Group was also involved in Tiger Woods's annual golf tournament, the AT&T National.

Investigation and receivership
During the week of February 13, 2009, Stanford issued a letter to clients saying: "Regulatory officers have visited our offices and have stated that these are routine examinations". On February 17, 2009, U.S. federal agents entered the company's Houston and Memphis offices. Law enforcement officials placed signs on the office doors stating that the company was temporarily closed:  "The company is still in operation but under the management of a receiver".

The Securities Exchange Commission's (SEC) charged Allen Stanford, Pendergest-Holt and Davis with fraud in connection with Stanford Financial Group's US$8 billion certificate of deposit (CD) investment scheme that offered "improbable and unsubstantiated high interest rates". This led the Federal government to freeze the assets of Allen Stanford, Stanford International Bank, Stanford Group Co., and Stanford Capital Management. In addition, Stanford International Bank placed a 60-day moratorium on early redemptions of its CDs.

On February 18 and 19, 2009, Ecuador and Peru suspended the operations of local Stanford units, and, in Venezuela and Panama, the governments seized local units of Stanford Bank. Mexico's financial regulators announced on February 19 that it was investigating the local affiliate of Stanford bank for possible violation of banking laws.

On February 27, 2009, Stanford official Laura Pendergest-Holt was arrested by Federal agents in connection with the alleged fraud. On that day the SEC said that Stanford and his accomplices operated a "massive Ponzi scheme", misappropriated billions of dollars of investors' money and falsified the Stanford International Bank's records to hide their fraud. "Stanford International Bank's financial statements, including its investment income, are fictional," the SEC said.

United States District Judge David Godbey froze all of the Stanford personal and corporate assets. Godbey gave them to Ralph Janvey, a Dallas receiver; Janvey will retain control until the SEC suit is resolved. A British receiver took the Antigua-based Stanford International Bank.

On July 1, 2009, James M. Davis, the CFO of the company, agreed to change course from his not guilty plea and plead guilty to three charges related to the Ponzi scheme fraud, once details can be worked out.

On November 13, 2009, the US District Court ordered brokerage accounts to be transferred to Dominick & Dominick LLC. The transfer became effective on January 20, 2010.

In 2011, an auction of Stanford's goods was held in Houston.

Headquarters 

Stanford was headquartered in the Galleria Tower II in Uptown Houston, Texas, U.S. Previously the company was headquartered in 5050 Westheimer Road, a three-story,  building across from The Galleria. Jennifer Dawson of the Houston Business Journal described the facility as "high-end office digs." By 2007 Stanford's headquarters moved to Galleria Tower II.

On May 18, 2010 the receiver entered into a stalking horse contract for the sale of 5050 Westheimer Road. During that month Black Forest Ventures LLC was the designated bidder to defeat at the auction, with a minimum bid being $12.5 million. The auction was scheduled to be held on Thursday June 24, 2010 at the offices of Baker Botts, L.L.P. in One Shell Plaza in Downtown Houston. The auction was canceled due to a lack of bids, and Black Forest's stipulated that it would acquire the building for $12.2 million. Black Forest bought the 5050 Westheimer building in July 2010.

Third-party settlements 
On March 19, 2012, the 5th U.S. Circuit Court of Appeals overturned a federal judge’s ruling from the previous year that threw out three class action lawsuits that are trying to use state laws to recover investor losses resulting from Stanford’s scheme. The ruling allows lawsuits by investors who lost millions in the Stanford Ponzi scheme to go forward against several third parties.

In February 2023, TD Bank of Canada agreed to pay the receiver $1.2 billion to Stanford-related settle claims. Four other banks agreed to pay a total of $0.4 billion; the five banks provided services to Stanford Financial during the two decades that it operated.

See also

 Bernie Madoff
 Sholam Weiss
 Federal Bureau of Investigation
 2007–2012 global financial crisis
 Laura Pendergest-Holt
 Ponzi scheme
 Pyramid scheme
 Scott Rothstein
 Stanford Bank Venezuela
 Tom Petters
 White-collar crime
List of investors in Bernard L. Madoff Securities

References

Further reading

External links
 Stanford Financial Group Receivership
 
 
 Stanford Watch at Houston Chronicle

 
2009 in economics
Financial services companies established in 1932
Financial services companies disestablished in 2009
Corporate scandals
Criminal investigation
Great Recession
Financial services companies of the United States
Investment management companies of the United States
Companies based in Houston
Pyramid and Ponzi schemes
2009 disestablishments in Texas